Kosovo is a relatively small territory. Because of the climatic position and complicated structure of the relief it  has a variety of climate systems.

Kosovo lies in the south part of the middle geographical latitude of the northern hemisphere and it is affected by the Mediterranean Mild Climate and European Continental Climate. Important factors that affect Kosovo's climate are: its position towards Eurasia and Africa, hydrographic masses (Atlantic Ocean and Mediterranean sea), atmospheric masses (tropic, arctic and continental) and others. Minor factors are: relief, hydrography, plain and vegetation.

Areas

The climatic area of the Ibar valley is influenced by continental air masses. This area is characterized by a dry climate and a total annual precipitation of 600 mm per year, approximately. The climatic area of dukagjini, which includes the watershed of the White Drin river, is influenced very much by the hot air masses, which cross the Adriatic Sea. The winter is characterized by heavy snowfalls. The climatic area of the mountains and forest parts is characterised by a typical forest clime, that is associated with heavy rainfalls ( per year), and summers that are very short and cold, and winters that are cold and with a lot of snow. Finally, it can be stated that the Kosovo territory is characterised by a sunny climate with variable temperature and humidity conditions.
General air flows, physical, geographical and topographical characteristics enforce territorial and temporal changes of climatic elements.

Air Temperature
Air Temperature is the main climatic element which tells the degree of air heat near-earth layers. In Kosovo there are thermal differences in horizontal and vertical direction. The eastern side is colder than the western part.

The highest average temperature for a year is in Prizren, the lowest temperature in Podujevo. Except Prizren and Istok, all other meteorological stations, in January have average temperatures under .

Except average temperature values, thermal characteristics of Kosovo will be better understood in the analyze of extreme values. Movements of air temperature from year to year are pretty much noticeable. In lower parts of Kosovo, tropic days usually last for 30 days.

Precipitation
Precipitation is an important indicator of the climate in Kosovo and it represents a meteorological element with significant changes with time and territory. Key features of the rainfall of each territory are: the submission forms, their distribution during the year, annual amount, pluviometric regime, the number of days with precipitation and their intensity.
You can see all precipitation forms in Kosovo. Important significance has the rainfall in hills and valleys, and heavy snowfall in the high mountain areas such as Prokletije and Šar Mountains. The presence of hail is an unfortunate phenomenon for the agriculture in Kosovo. This form of precipitation mostly occurs during July and August.

Even though Kosovo lies in a relatively small territory, there are noticeable differences between territories and their amount of precipitation. Kosovo is affected by middle-maritime and middle-continental precipitation regime. On the west, the middle-maritime form is more present. This type of precipitation regime is known for big rainfalls during the year (over ), the maximum amount during November and the minimum during summer. The eastern part is affected by the middle-continental type of precipitation, which is known with lack of rainfall during a year (over ), the maximum amount during May and the minimum during winter. Snowfall is a common occurrence during the cold months of the year. In the low parts of Kosovo there are averagely 26 days with snowfall, while the high parts have over 100 days. The number of days with snow and the thickness depend on the relief. Snowfall has an importance on keeping the wetness of the surface, creating water reserves, tourism etc.

Winds
Winds are a random meteorological phenomenon in Kosovo. The dominant wind direction usually has the bigger force and speed. The average wind speed in Kosovo is 1.3 m/s in Pec to 2.4 m/s Ferizaj. Extreme wind speeds in Kosovo are around 31 m/s which occur during March and April; usually end up with causing damage on houses.

Insolation

Insolation is a measure of solar radiation energy received on a given surface area and recorded during a given time. Insolation is a climatic element that has an importance in different economical activities such as: agriculture, tourism etc.

The period of insolation depends on astronomical, meteorological and relief factors. Insolation is smaller in narrow valleys, river valleys and mountain ranges as a result of the increase of overcast and elevation.

Kosovo has on average 2,066 hours with sun per year or approximately 5.7 hours per day. The highest insolation value is in Pristina with 2.140 hours for 1 year, while Peć with the smallest insolation value of 1.958 hours, with 2.067 hours and Prizren with 2.099 hours. The maximum insolation in Kosovo occurs during July, while the lowest insolation occurs in December.

Climatic territorial differences
The climatic changes based on territories depend on various factors, such as: vegetation, humidity of the territory etc. Climate classifications are usually based on: wind exposure, mountain height and direction, climatic effects on vegetation and watercourses.
From all the climatic classifications made in Kosovo, the most accurate one is the one provided by W. Köppen. According to this classification, Kosovo is part of C and D types of climate. Kosovo's hot average climate during summer months is under  and the cold average is above . According to the thermal characteristics, amount of rainfall and their regime in low parts of Kosovo, we get two subtypes of climate:
Metohija subtype and
Kosovo subtype
The climatic subtype of the western part has soft winters and a big amount of rainfall. These characteristics are inherited by the Mediterranean mild climate. The climatic subtype of Kosovo has cold winters and lack of rainfall, characteristics inherited from the continental type of climate. Even though Kosovo has these climatic characteristics most of the time, there might be a major change in climate on certain years only. In 1992, Kosovo had a very hot and dry summer, which fits the B climatic type of Köppen. D-climatic type which is known for average temperatures of  during cold months and  during hot months can be found in high parts of Kosovo, such as Prokletije, the Šar Mountains and Kopaonik. This type of climate is known by the name subalpine and alpine.

Human Effect
Climate is important in human life, as well as vital activist such as: agriculture, rest, recreation, tourism, transport, medicine, sanitary-hygienic conditions.

Weatherboxes

See also
Kosovo
Geography of Kosovo
Tourism in Kosovo

Notes

References

Bibliography
Çavolli, Riza (1993). Gjeografia e Kosovës. ETMMK.
Geographical Association of Kosova (2008). Geographical Exploration. SHOQATA E GJEOGRAFËVE TË KOSOVËS.
Group of authors (2004). 40 Vjetori i Departamentit të Gjeografisë. DEPARTAMENTI I GJEOGRAFISË.

External links
http://www.worldclimateguide.co.uk/climateguides/kosovo/pristina.php
https://web.archive.org/web/20140527212027/http://www.kosovo-mining.org/kosovoweb/en/kosovo/climate.html
The World Factbook
http://www.weather2travel.com/climate-guides/kosovo/
http://www.spainexchange.com/guide/KV-climate.htm
http://www.iexplore.com/travel-guides/europe/kosovo/weather
http://www.spainexchange.com/guide/KV-climate.htm
https://books.google.com/books?id=uSaH1bKAb8QC&ei=Lg8qUYOYEY-izATqq4C4BQ

Environment of Kosovo
Kosovo
Kosovo